Bougainville is a French landing platform dock, or in certain cases, a research vessel ordered on behalf of nuclear experimentation centers and constructed by the Chantiers Dubigeon shipyard in Nantes. During the bulk of its career, it was used for transportation for nuclear tests in Polynesia or humanitarian aid.

History
The ship was built as a landing platform dock, but was used as a transport ship. Bougainville was laid down on 28 January 1986, but shortly after, construction was put on hold. Construction resumed and the ship was launched on 3 October  of the same year. When it was commissioned on 25 June 1988, it was based in Polynesia, where it performed missions of Tahiti-Hao-Mururoa-Fangataufa (inter-island maritime transport). In 1998, Bougainville was converted to an intelligence ship. In 2001, it was tasked with collecting information in the Indian Ocean as part of the War in Afghanistan in the aftermath of the 11 September attacks. Bougainville supported coalition forces during the conflict. Just after conversion, the vessel took part in supporting efforts to combat the Chikungunya virus and then took part in Mission Corymbe-91 the next year. In 2008 it was decommissioned after 20 years of service and placed in reserve. Five years later, the ship was used as a breakwater for a drydock containing the aircraft carrier . It was sold for scrap in 2018 to Ghent and left Toulon on 17 May 2018 for dismantling.

Citations

Cold War amphibious warfare vessels of France
Amphibious warfare vessel classes
Electronic intelligence ships
1986 ships
Ships built by Chantiers Dubigeon